Sunnybrook Park is a surface light rail transit stop under construction on Line 5 Eglinton, a future line that will be part of the Toronto subway system. It will be located at the intersection of Leslie Street and Eglinton Avenue. The intersection is largely surrounded by park lands in the valley of the West Branch of the Don River, which includes destinations such as E.T. Seton Park, Serena Gundy Park, Wilket Creek Park, Sunnybrook Park and Edwards Gardens. This will be the westernmost at-grade surface stop. The station is scheduled to open in 2023.

The stop is located on the east side of the intersection of Leslie Street and Eglinton Avenue East. The stop has parallel side platforms. Access to the platforms is via the pedestrian crossing on the east side of the signalized street intersection.

During the planning stages for Line 5 Eglinton, the stop was given the working name "Leslie", which is identical to the pre-existing Leslie station on Line 4 Sheppard. On November 23, 2015, a report to the TTC Board recommended giving a unique name to each station in the subway system (including Line 5 Eglinton). Thus, the LRT stop was renamed "Sunnybrook Park".

Location of tracks
The environmental assessment was for the line to run in the middle of Eglinton Avenue through the valley at Leslie Street. However, in late 2012 and early 2013, there were proposals to locate the tracks elsewhere.
 
In 2012, Metrolinx discovered that there would be minimal cost differential between tunnelling under the West Don River at Leslie Street versus laying the track on the surface. Also, tunnelling here would have provided "significant improvements to construction staging, schedule and traffic impacts", according to Jamie Robinson at Metrolinx. Thus, in December 2012, Metrolinx proposed continuing the LRT tunnel from Laird station to Science Centre station and eliminating the planned surface stop at Sunnybrook Park (Leslie Street). It did not want to build an underground station at that location as it would cost $80 to $100 million (as compared to about $3 million for a surface stop). Metrolinx considered the cost of an underground station to be unjustified given its low projected ridership (650 passengers at the busiest hour). Local residents objected to the elimination of their stop, and by mid-2013, Metrolinx had relented and the surface stop was restored.

Members of the public asked Metrolinx why it was proposing a centre-of-road alignment instead of running the tracks on the south side of Eglinton Avenue through the valley at Leslie Street. The latter would have avoided going through the signaled intersection at Leslie Street. Jamie Robinson at Metrolinx explained that the latter "was more expensive and required an EA amendment. Due to project implementation timelines the project is proceeding with the EA option". He also stated, "It is very difficult (if not impossible) to relocate the portal from the centre of Eglinton (as proposed in the current design) and shift it to the south side of the right-of-way and continue to use the existing bridge." As for building a viaduct across the valley as suggested by some members of the public, Robinson said a viaduct "was more expensive and required an EA amendment".

Surface connections 

, the following are the proposed connecting routes that would serve this station when Line 5 Eglinton opens:

References

External links

 published September 3, 2021, by the Eglinton Crosstown project

Line 5 Eglinton stations